Jaxsta is an Australia-based database of music credits. According to a 2018 report in The Sydney Morning Herald, "it wants to be a cross between Bloomberg and LinkedIn, a trusted source for the music industry when it comes to finding out who played what role on your favourite songs." This extends to performers, artists, engineers, producers and songwriters. Jaxsta's data is content-owner supplied rather than crowd-sourced.

History 
Jaxsta was founded in Sydney in 2015 by former movie and music industry professional Jacqui Louez Schoorl and her husband Louis Schoorl, a producer and songwriter. Jaxsta has offices in Sydney and Los Angeles, with representatives in London and New York.

The idea for Jaxsta was first formulated by Louez Schoorl in 2006 when she was transitioning from the film to the music industry and noticed music credits metadata was becoming lost with the transition to digital music, as the credits that had once populated vinyl record sleeve and CD booklets were vanishing as downloading was becoming more prevalent. Jaxsta derives its name from the credits on vinyl "jackets" (covers) – the stars of the jackets – i.e. liner notes.

The company was launched in beta mode on June 13, 2019, with the claim that it contained more than 100 million music credits, including those for 1.9 million songwriters, 1.3 million artists, 150,000 producers and 100,000 engineers. As of June 2022, those numbers had risen to 240 million deep-linked official credits, 67 million individual web pages, 30 million unique recordings credits and 15 million profiles, with 700,000 new credits processed each day.

As of June 2022, Jaxsta has more than 295 data partner agreements in place. Its data partners include the three major labels, the Merlin Network of independent music companies and unions including the American Federation of Musicians and SAG-AFTRA, as well as independent distributors such as CDBaby, DistroKid and SoundCloud Repost. The Recording Industry Association of America (RIAA), The Recording Academy and the Australian Recording Industry Association (ARIA) are also data partners. Jaxsta was listed as a public company on the ASX on December 28, 2018.

In February 2023, it was announced Jaxsta had acquired the social networking platform for musicians, creatives and fans, Vampr.

Membership Plans 
Jaxsta's business-to-business membership plan was launched on November 21, 2019. It offered music industry specific tools such as industry events calendars, market insights, chart alerts for artists and non-artists, and gave members the ability to claim and manage their Jaxsta profile page. On April 22, 2020 Jaxsta announced it was waiving the $US150 annual membership fee and making Jaxsta membership free for the rest of 2020 to assist the music industry during the COVID-19 pandemic.

In August 2021, to coincide with the return of paid memberships, Jaxsta introduced two levels of membership: Jaxsta Core, a free introductory membership, and Jaxsta Plus, which for $US49 a year offered members access to a suite of features such as Credit and Chart Alerts, the ability to claim their profile (or the profiles of those they represent), Prioritize Your Credits, and more.

In June 2022 Jaxsta's membership plans evolved to reflect the music industry's demand for accurate metadata, resulting in the introduction of a further two levels of membership: Business and Enterprise. Jaxsta Plus was rebranded Creator, and Jaxsta Core became the free membership level.

Songtradr Investment 
On September 10, 2020, Jaxsta announced a commercial agreement and an investment with Songtradr, the Los-Angeles-based global B2B music rights and licensing marketplace platform. Overall, the deal was worth A$1.92 million (including A$1.42 million via a convertible note). Through this arrangement, Jaxsta members gained direct access to Songtradr’s Neighboring Rights revenue collection service, while Songtradr utilises Jaxsta’s music credits metadata to I.D. and scoop-up uncollected revenue. In April 2022 Songtradr announced an additional investment of $A3.0 million via a secured convertible note.

Leadership Change 
On April 28, 2022, it was announced that Louez Schoorl would be moving into the Founder role, and former Chief Marketing Officer Beth Appleton would be Jaxsta's new CEO. The Music Network reported that "the change will allow Louez Schoorl to focus on the Jaxsta product and our community and creative relationships".

Appleton joined Jaxsta in July 2021 from Warner Music Australia, where she served as General Manager and Senior Vice President Marketing Australasia.

Content 
In December 2019, Jaxsta launched its podcast, Humans of Music, hosted by former Rolling Stone Australia editor Rod Yates. Guests have included Snow Patrol frontman Gary Lightbody, Billy Bragg, Bethany Cosentino, Neko Case, John Butler and M-Phazes.

In June 2020, it was announced that Yates would head up Jaxsta's dedicated editorial portal.

Jaxsta One Sheet 
In November 2021, Jaxsta introduced the Jaxsta One Sheet in an effort to help music professionals create a "shareable resume". The One Sheet is pre-populated by information on the user's Jaxsta profile, including credits, social media statistics, TikTok plays, contact details, bio, image and more.

References

Australian companies established in 2015
Online music and lyrics databases
Music search engines
Social cataloging applications
Music information retrieval
Companies based in Sydney